List of Indian stock exchange may refer to one of the 9 official operating stock and commodity exchanges  by SEBI or the numerous defunct ones.

Operating stock exchanges
Bombay Stock Exchange (BSE) in Mumbai, one of the two principal large stock exchanges of India.It has a big market cap of $3.3 trillion.
Calcutta Stock Exchange (CSE) founded in Bengal(1863), India's oldest and one of the biggest stock exchange, with market cap of $720 million.
India International Exchange (India INX) in Gift City.
Metropolitan Stock Exchange of India Ltd. (MSE) in Mumbai.
National Stock Exchange of India (NSE) in Mumbai, one of the two principal large stock exchanges of India.With the Market cap of 3.27 trillion dollars.
National Commodity & Derivatives Exchange Ltd. (NCDEX)USA in Mumbai.
Multi Commodity Exchange of India Ltd. (MCX) in Mumbai.

Former stock exchanges
Ahmedabad Stock Exchange (closed in 2018)
Delhi Stock Exchange (closed in 2017)
Gauhati Stock Exchange (closed in 2015)
Jaipur Stock Exchange (closed in 2015)
Madhya Pradesh Stock Exchange (closed in 2015)
Madras Stock Exchange (MSE) (closed in 2015)
OTC Exchange of India (closed in 2015)
Pune Stock Exchange (closed in 2015)
UP Stock Exchange (closed in 2015)
Vadodara Stock Exchange (closed in 2015)
Bangalore Stock Exchange (closed in 2014)
Cochin Stock Exchange, Kochi (trading stopped in 2005, closed in 2014)
Inter-connected Stock Exchange of India (closed in 2014)
Ludhiana Stock Exchange (closed in 2014)
Bhubaneshwar Stock Exchange (closed in 2005)
Coimbatore Stock Exchange (requested exiting trading in 2009)
Hyderabad Stock Exchange (closed in 2007)
Magadh Stock Exchange (closed in 2007)
Mangalore Stock Exchange (closed in 2004)
Raipur Stock Exchange   (closed in 2018)